Mujrim Haazir is a TV show based on Bimal Mitra's classic novel Asami Hazir. It aired on Doordarshan in 1988. The show was directed by Rakesh Chowdhary, and produced by Samvaad Video Private Limited. The story was adapted for television by writer Mir Muneer. The secondary theme "Gun Guna" (adapted from "Palkir Gaan") was played whenever Nutan's character rode a Palki. 
This was Navni Parihar's debut serial.

Nutan, Utpal Dutt, Rita Bhaduri, Rajeev Verma, Navni Parihar, Virendra Singh, Mangal Dhillon and others star in the show. The show was Nutan's final work before her death.

Cast 
 Nutan - Kaliganj ki bahu
 Utpal Dutt
 Virendra Singh
 Navni Parihar- Nayantara 
 Mangal Dhillon
 Rita Bhaduri
 Rajeev Verma
 Ajit Vachani
 Mohan Bhandari
 Aanjjan Srivastav
 Shashi Puri

References

DD National original programming
1980s Indian television series
1988 Indian television series debuts
Television shows based on Indian novels